The Nissan 180SX is a fastback automobile that was produced by Nissan Motors between 1988 and 1998. It is based on the S13 chassis from the Nissan S platform with the variants receiving an R designation (ex. PS13 and RPS13), and was sold exclusively in Japan paired with the CA18 motor in the early models; later models paired with the SR20 motor. Outside of Japan, it was re-badged as the 200SX and in the US market as the Nissan 240SX, paired with the single overhead cam KA24E motor and later with the dual-overhead model KA24DE.

Model nomenclature and markets

The 180SX was built and sold by Nissan as a sister model to the Nissan Silvia from model year 1989 through 1998, but sold at two different Japanese Nissan dealerships. The Silvia was sold at Nissan Prince Store, and the 180SX was sold at Nissan Bluebird Store locations. In Japan, the 180SX replaced the Gazelle. The S13 Silvia was discontinued in 1993, but the 180SX was successful enough to convince Nissan to keep it in the market for the full length of the next generation Silvia (S14). The 180SX differed from the S13 Silvia in that it featured pop-up headlights and a liftgate with different body work at the rear of the vehicle. Specifications and equipment were similar; however, the naturally aspirated CA18DE engine was not offered.

The name 180SX was originally in reference to the 1.8 liter displacement CA18DET engine used in the chassis. In 1991, however, the engine was upgraded to a 2.0 liter model, offered in two forms: the turbocharged SR20DET variant and the naturally aspirated SR20DE engine, which was introduced in 1996. Although the new engine was of larger displacement, the 180SX nomenclature remained.

180SX was also a trim level of the S110 Silvia in Europe. The badges for this model read "Silvia 180SX", so this car is not properly a 180SX by model, but a version of the Silvia instead.

Other discrepancies from this standard were distributed to Micronesia and South Pacific islands, including LHD cars with 180SX badges and non-retractable headlamps.

Like the Japanese 180SX SR20DET discrepancy, European, as well as South African models of the S13 chassis were called 200SX though equipped with the CA18DET engine.

In North America, It was sold as the Nissan 240SX Fastback with the KA24DE engine and various other trim differences.

In Europe the car was sold as the 200SX in spite of featuring the 1.8-liter CA18DET engine, producing . This allowed the 200SX to reach  in 7.5 seconds and onto 220 km/h. The car had a facelift in 1991 with new smoother bumpers, limited slip differential, and larger brakes. This 200SX was sold between 1989 and 1994 until the change to the succeeding S14 version.

180SX and Silvias are now generally available for import into the US market with EPA and DOT exemptions under the NHTSA 25-year classic import law. The United States has a handful of JDM Import companies.

Japanese tuning company Kid's Heart produced 500 official units of a 180SX and Silvia hybrid known as the Sileighty. These cars were built upon the standard 1998 180SX platform but had the headlamps, front wings, hood, front bumper and fixings from a Nissan Silvia swapped over. These cars were available with the naturally aspirated or the turbo engine, with the same  as a standard S13. A five-speed manual or a four-speed automatic were available. Kid's Heart also offered some mechanical and tuning upgrades, including revised suspension, an improved limited-slip differential and an ECU tune from Nismo.

180SX generations 

The 180SX came in three major generations: the first one was released in March 1989 up to January 1991, the second was from January 1991 to August 1996, and the third and final one from August 1996 to December 1998.

The first iteration of the 180SX came in two versions called Type I (standard type) and Type II (advanced type). Nissan's HICAS II four wheel steering system was optional only on the Type II 180SX. All versions had the CA18DET engine with 175 PS. The 5-speed manual and 4-speed automatic transmissions were available in all types. HICAS-equipped cars have a leading K in their model code; RS13 thus becomes KRS13 when fitted with HICAS.

The second iteration 180SX was released in January 1991 and included several major changes from the first model. This included the SR20DET engine with 205 PS. Although the engine was larger than the previous CA18DET engine the '180SX' nomenclature remained. The brakes were enlarged and limited slip differential added. The front bumper and parts of the interior were also redesigned. Type I and Type II were once again offered with only trim differences separating the two. The 15-inch alloy wheels also changed in design from the first model. Nissan's Super HICAS four wheel steering was an option on all models as were 5-speed manual and 4-speed automatic transmissions.

The second iteration was facelifted in January 1991. Although the car largely remained visually and mechanically unchanged, an additional trim level called Type III was added. Electronic climate control and CD audio were also added as options.

An additional facelift was performed in 1994, the trim levels were renamed to Type R and Type X, with Type X being the higher of the two. Overall the car remained almost unchanged however.

A final facelift to the middle model occurred in August 1996 with the addition of a driver's side airbag and a change of alloy wheels amongst other minor details.

The final iteration was released in August 1996. It had a revised front bumper, tail lights, 15-inch wheels and interior. The mechanical and safety package received minor changes, such as the addition of a driver's side airbag, seat belt pre-tensioners, and some changes in the wiring and ECU. Three levels of 180SX were offered: Type X, Type S and Type R, with the Type S being the first 180SX to be offered without a turbocharged engine.

The Type X and Type R both shared the same 205 PS (202 hp) engine and overall mechanical package however the Type R lacked many of the cosmetic additions of the Type X such as the front lip, rear spoiler, side skirts, rear valence and 15-inch alloy wheels. The Type S was powered by a naturally aspirated SR20DE engine with 140 PS, but was similar in mechanical and cosmetic details to the top of the range Type X. The Type S however did not have the option of Nissan's Super HICAS four-wheel steering system like the turbocharged models did.

The Type X and Type R ceased production in October 1998 however the Type S and an additional naturally aspirated model called the Type G continued production until December 1998 when all 180SX production ceased.

RS13U 

The RS13U 200SX is a fastback 3 door hatch with a body shell like the Japanese market 180SX. The notchback coupe version was never offered in the European market - though a number of Japanese market S13 Silvias have been imported privately. Like its predecessor the Nissan Silvia (R)S12 in the European market it used pop-up headlights. The RS13U 200SX was made until December 1993 but sales continued from stocks in the UK until the end of 1994. For a few months both 200SX S14 and RS13U were available.

The RS13U 200SX were all powered by the CA18DET engines carried over from the end of S12 RS-X production, with an intercooler added to the CA18DET for a slight increase in stability and power. Despite its name, the SR20DET engine was never offered in Europe as it would have needed new European-type tests and regulations.

The chassis with MacPherson strut front and multilink rear suspension was common to all S13 and RS13 models. The European 200SX initially had 257 mm front brakes and rear disc service brakes with drum parking brakes in the rotor hubs. Later models had larger 280 mm front brakes.

The European 200SX RS13U had a number of parts as standard that were Nismo optional parts in Japan. Water/oil heat exchanger. Differential oil cooler AND extended finned rear cover holding 0.6 litres more oil, even on models with open differential. Alloy radiator. 3.916 Final drive ratio. These were required as the RS13U 200SX has no speed limiter and any car in Europe could visit West Germany where on the Autobahn it could legally be held at very high speeds for a sustained length of time. Japanese cars are fitted with a  speed limiter.

Digital climate control was not fitted to European models. HICAS rear wheel steering wasn't available. Nor was the later Japanese model's sports automatic gearbox control.

The FS5W71C gearboxes had different ratios to all other S13/S14. A key change was the layshaft gear which changed from 22/31 to 21/32, thus running the layshaft slower and at higher torque. This gearbox is considered weaker than other S13/S14 gearboxes. The front of the SR20DET gearbox with bell housing can be removed and a CA18DET bell housing fitted to allow the gearboxes to be swapped.

Trim level designation

UK

For the UK there were various trim levels but it never used GL/SL etc. that other Nissan models used.

The early models had highback sports style seats with a fixed headrest. The seats, door cards and glove box were fabric in a blue and brown stripe/flecked pattern. It had 13 hole "tear drop" alloy wheels, which gave a lower drag coefficient than later 7 spoke wheels. The carpets were a short loop pile in grey. A spoiler was fitted on the back of the hatch, this has an overhang to the rear.

On the introduction of the smooth bumper facelift Nissan also offered the "200SX Executive". This doesn't appear on the car at all but only on the UK vehicle Log Book. The Executive was a locally enhanced specification produced by the UK importer AFG. At launch and as tested by the press it initially had limited slip differential, leather seats (high back seats re-trimmed in UK), leather trimmed steering wheel and gear knob, headlamp washers, air conditioning, sun roof and a multi change CD player in the boot. Some cars that were sold as Executive arrived without sunroof so a local accessory sun roof was fitted during the upgrade. It very quickly lost the CD player and the leather seats for low back seats with adjustable head rests. During the period that the Executive was sold the base model was downgraded to steel wheels. As most cars with steel wheels have had alloy wheels fitted and the grey waffle fabric trim on seats and doors was common, it's no longer easy to tell an Executive from a base model and the log book must be checked. The cabin carpet was now a long "cut" pile in a pale blue.

When the Executive was discontinued all 200SX got the 7 spoke alloys.

Late model UK cars produced from June '93 and mainly sold in 1994 had a much higher trim level, often confused with the Executive. They had low back grey Leather seats, a slot CD player / radio and 3 CD storage drawers in the space below. The CD player also required use of a separate amplifier mounted under the CD player. The door and glove box trim was a suede like pale blue/grey Alcantara. The last European spec 200SX was made in Dec '93. Sales in the UK continued throughout '94.

West Germany
This helped prevent the blades from lifting off the screen at the high speeds expected on the Autobahn. In 1989, additional features were added to the Nissan 180SX in West Germany, including a low back seat, headlamp aiming control, and a limited slip differential became standard fitment.

Drifting

Like other S platform cars, the 180SX is popular as a drift car. The car is a frequent entrant at the D1 Grand Prix and was used in Masato Kawabata's 2013 championship victory. Kazuya Matsukawa also won the 2007 Street Legal category with a 180SX.

Specifications

Engine

Performance

Suspension
Front: MacPherson strut
Rear: Multi-link

Related vehicles
The 180SX is one of the cars based on the Nissan S platform.

The S13 platform also includes:
 Silvia - The first S13 based production car. Different body with no liftgate.
 240SX - North American version of the 180SX. Left hand drive with a 2.4L NA engine (KA24E and KA24DE).
 200SX - Name given to the 180SX in Europe. This name was also given to the S14 and S15 series Silvia on the Australian market.

References

External links

180SX
Rear-wheel-drive vehicles
Vehicles with four-wheel steering
Sport compact cars
Coupés
1990s cars
Cars introduced in 1988
Cars discontinued in 1998